A Smart Set is a 1919 British silent crime film directed by A. V. Bramble and starring Concordia Merrill, Arthur M. Cullin and Judd Green.

Plot 
A detective poses as an opium fiend to save an addicted knight and his daughter from abduction by a jeweler.

Cast
 Concordia Merrel — Pauline
 Arthur M. Cullin — Sir Philip Trevor
 Neville Percy — Neville Temple
 Judd Green — Parson
 S. J. Warmington — Herbert Sterne
 Doriel Paget — Fay Trevor
 Gwen Williams
 Iris Mackie
 Gordon McLeod
 Rex Harold

References

External links

1919 films
1919 crime films
British silent feature films
Films directed by A. V. Bramble
British black-and-white films
British crime films
1910s English-language films
1910s British films